Mariya Ivanovna Fadeyeva (born 4 March 1958) is a Russian former rower who competed in the 1980 Summer Olympics.

References

1958 births
Living people
Russian female rowers
Soviet female rowers
Olympic rowers of the Soviet Union
Rowers at the 1980 Summer Olympics
Olympic bronze medalists for the Soviet Union
Olympic medalists in rowing
Medalists at the 1980 Summer Olympics